Gangut (Гангут) is the Russian transliteration of the Swedish name (Hangö udd) for Hanko Peninsula. It may have the following meanings:
 The Battle of Gangut in 1714
 Ships of the Imperial Russian Navy named after the battle:
 Russian ship of the line Gangut (1719), 92-gun first rate ship of the line, launched in 1719
 Russian ship of the line Gangut (1825), 84-gun third rate ship of the line, launched in 1825, participated in Battle of Navarino, converted to screw in 1854, training ship in 1862, decommissioned in 1871
 Russian coast defense ship Gangut (1888) 
 Russian battleship Gangut (1911) 
 Gangut-class battleship
 The Russian name for the town of Hanko during the time Finland was a Grand duchy of the Russian Empire.
 The "Invincible Gangut" (Непокоренный Гангут), the Hanko Soviet naval base in Finland 1940–41 leased by Finland to the Soviet Union in the Moscow Peace Treaty that ended the Winter War.